Vision d'Etat (foaled April 20, 2005 in Maine-et-Loire died in 2018) was a French  Thoroughbred racehorse.

Background
Vision d'Erat was sired by Group One winner Chichicastenango and out of the mare Uberaba, he was bought for €39,000 by Jacques Detre and trainer Eric Libaud's wife, Vicky.

Racing career
At age two, Vision d'Etat won the Prix le Pompier at the Les Sables-d'Olonne racecourse and the Prix de la Malmontagne at the Fontainebleau racecourse. At age three, he won the Prix Alcantara II at Saint-Cloud Racecourse, and at Chantilly Racecourse, both the Prix de Suresnes and the prestigious French Classic, the Prix du Jockey Club.  His last outing in mid September was at Longchamp Racecourse where he won the Prix Niel. Undefeated in his first six starts, on October 5, 2008 Vision d'Etat finished fifth in France's most prestigious race, the Prix de l'Arc de Triomphe.

Vision d'Etat began his 2009 campaign in early April with a third-place finish in the Prix d'Harcourt. On April 26 he won the Group One, Prix Ganay. On 17 June 2009, he won the Prince of Wales's Stakes at Royal Ascot, the horse came up the inside from last place to the land the 1m 2f race. A second placing in the Prix Foy and a defeat in the Prix de l'Arc de Triomphe followed, before he dropped back to his favoured 2000 metre distance when winning the Hong Kong Cup at Sha Tin.

Vision d'Etat started his 2010 campaign with a 12th placing in the Dubai World Cup. He returned to win a Group 3 in August, before ending his career with a second placing in the Champion Stakes and a fourth in the Hong Kong Cup.

Since 2011, Vision d'Etat is stallion at Haras de Grandcamp where he spend 6 seasons . He died on 25.march 2018. due hart attack in Haras de Cercy where he was placed  .

References

Career details: 
http://www.harasdegrandcamp.com/

2005 racehorse births
Thoroughbred family 1-l
Racehorses bred in France
Racehorses trained in France
French Thoroughbred Classic Race winners